"Antes" is a song by Puerto Rican rapper Anuel AA and Puerto Rican singer Ozuna, released in January 2021. It was released as the second single from their collaborative album Los Dioses.

Background
Ozuna previewed firstly the song in September in an Instagram live. In January, 2021, he posted an official preview of the single. Later the preview leaked got copyrighted on YouTube claiming that Anuel AA is the other artist in the song.

Music video
The video of "Antes" was released on 22 January 2021 at the same day they released the album, with the song in Ozuna's YouTube channel. It was filmed in Miami and directed by Fernando Lugo and is about their yearning to meet a beautiful lady they met in the club one more time.

Live performances 
Anuel AA and Ozuna performed "Antes" at The Tonight Show Starring Jimmy Fallon on January 29, 2021.

Charts

Weekly charts

Year-end charts

Certifications

References

2021 songs
2021 singles
Anuel AA songs
Ozuna (singer) songs
Songs written by Anuel AA
Songs written by Ozuna (singer)
Spanish-language songs